Śląsk Wrocław is a professional football club based in Wrocław, Poland. During the 2014–15 campaign the club competed in the Ekstraklasa and the Polish Cup.

Competitions

Ekstraklasa

Championship Round

Polish Cup

League table

References

External links

Śląsk Net 
Wrocław Kibice Sport 
ŚLĄSKopedia 
About WKS Śląsk Wrocław

Śląsk Wrocław seasons
Slask Wroclaw